Ian Gregson (born September 2, 1962) is an actor, musician, activist and author in British Columbia, Canada.

He was born in St Helens, Lancashire, England. As a young boy his promising athletic career in track and field seemed to end on May 18, 1978.  During his lunch hour at Ashton-in-Makerfield Grammar School (now The Byrchall High School), Gregson was involved in a railway accident that resulted in the loss of his right leg above the knee. Undaunted by this physical setback, he continued his involvement in track and field by taking up shot put and weight training. In September 1981, he emigrated to Canada with his family.

Paralympian 

Gregson first gained national media attention in the fall of 1982 after completing the first ever Terry Fox Run in Port Coquitlam.  Shortly thereafter, he began to focus on competing in disability sport events and in 1983 became Canada's top amputee athlete. In 1984 and 1988 he represented Canada at the Paralympics, and in 1986, after receiving a fourth place at the World Championships in Sweden, he became the first athlete with a disability in Canada to receive a post secondary athletic scholarship. In 1987 Gregson received the Chevron Canada Award for Post Secondary Sports. After retirement he became Chair of the BC Disability Games, overseeing several successful events during his tenure. In 1998 he published his first book, Irresistible Force: A History of Disability Sport in Canada, via Raincoast Books in Vancouver.

SFU 

Whilst competing for Canada, Gregson returned to post-secondary education at VCC Langara and then later he received his BA in communications from Simon Fraser University. He was the first person in his family to receive a degree. He was also the first athlete with a disability in Canada to receive an athletic scholarship. In 2000 he returned to SFU to work for the Office of Research Services.

Disability issues 

Throughout the 1990s Gregson wrote for numerous magazines ranging from regular columns in Canada's leading disability and mainstream magazines.  This included a controversial article on disability and sex in Larry Flynt's Hustler. As a result, he gained a reputation as a writer who was not afraid to tackle uncomfortable issues.

In 1998 Gregson's "Irresistible Force" was published through Polestar Press - essentially a history of disability sport in Canada. The book is now out of print.

Politics 

Introduced to politics via Svend Robinson, Gregson worked on federal NDP campaigns in the early 1990s
In 2001 ran for MLA in the British Columbia election in the constituency of Vancouver-Hastings as Green Party candidate, and received 14.9% of the popular vote
He ran again for 2005 in Vancouver-Hastings and received 9% of the popular vote.
He was Financial Agent for the Vancouver East Green Party from 2004 to 2007, President of Vancouver Hastings Green Party Constituency from 2004 to 2008, and ran in the 2008 Vancouver municipal election for the Work Less Party, finishing 23rd of 32 candidates with more than 10,000 votes.  In 2011 he ran for De-growth Vancouver and received 7,872 votes, finishing 28th of 41 candidates.

Music 

After taking up guitar whilst in hospital after his accident in 1978, Gregson finally took the instrument seriously in 2000 and eventually joined East Vancouver's The Carnival Band.

In September 2006 he started Mr M and The All Nighters, a Northern Soul tribute band, influenced by the music popularised in his native Wigan and the Wigan Casino. In 2011 he started Ai Vertigo, an original rock oriented band based in Vancouver. In 2013 he started a new band the Van City Soul Quartet featuring some of the best singers in the city. Gregson also was associated with the legendary Cory Weeds' Cellar Jazz in Kitsilano as sound technician and room booker.

Acting 

In 2009 Gregson returned to work in the Vancouver film industry as a background actor. His roles have included an amputee stunt double for local actor Chad Willet in When Calls the Heart for Hallmark, and Gregson played an amputee ghost in Season 4 Episode 1Seance of R.L. Stein's The Haunting Hour.

References

External links 
 Ian Gregson's Actor's Profile Page
 Ian Gregson's Facebook Page
 Ian's Band "Ian's Music Page"
 Ian's Blog on living without a car in Vancouver
 Article on amputee sprinter Oscar Pistorius for The Tyee
 

Canadian amputees
Green Party of British Columbia candidates in British Columbia provincial elections
Canadian disability rights activists
Canadian environmentalists
Degrowth advocates
English emigrants to Canada
Green Party of British Columbia politicians
People from St Helens, Merseyside
1962 births
Living people
Canadian rock musicians
Canadian politicians with disabilities